Richsquare Friends Meetinghouse and Cemetery is an historic Quaker meeting house and cemetery located in Franklin Township, Henry County, Indiana. The meeting house was built in 1895, and is a one-story, brick building with a two-story Romanesque Revival style corner tower. A concrete block rear addition was built in 1955. It sits on a limestone foundation and has a steep gable roof.  The adjacent cemetery was established in 1832 and remain an active burial ground with over 383 marked graves.

It was added to the National Register of Historic Places in 2006.

References

Quaker meeting houses in Indiana
Churches on the National Register of Historic Places in Indiana
Romanesque Revival architecture in Indiana
Churches completed in 1895
1832 establishments in Indiana
Buildings and structures in Henry County, Indiana
National Register of Historic Places in Henry County, Indiana